Brother Cane is an American rock band that released three albums in the 1990s. Formed in Alabama in 1990 by singer and guitarist Damon Johnson and bassist Glenn Maxey, the line-up was completed by guitarist Roman Glick and drummer Scott Collier. The band's self-titled debut album was released in 1993, and after some line-up changes, this was followed by Seeds in 1995, and Wishpool in 1998. Brother Cane disbanded thereafter, but reformed in 2005, again in 2011, and are active again in 2022.

History
The band's debut album, Brother Cane, peaked at #14 on the Billboard Heatseekers chart, while the lead single, "Got No Shame", peaked at #2 on the Billboard Mainstream Rock chart on September 18, 1993. Maxey subsequently left the band, and Glick then switched to bass while the band added a new guitarist, David Anderson.

Seeds was released on July 4, 1995, and the single "And Fools Shine On" stayed at number 1 on Billboard Rock Charts for six weeks. It was included on the soundtrack for Halloween: The Curse of Michael Myers in 1995, as well as three other songs, "Hung on a Rope", "20/20 Faith", and "Horses & Needles". 

The band's third album, Wishpool, was released in March 1998, and featured the single "I Lie in the Bed I Make," which was their second #1 single on the Mainstream Rock Tracks chart, maintaining that position for four weeks. That same year, a live version of the band's song "Lead My Follow" was featured on a Birmingham, Alabama charitable album titled Live in the X Lounge. The album was released to benefit United Cerebral Palsy of Greater Birmingham, an organization in the band's hometown.

Brother Cane disbanded after touring for Wishpool, despite a great deal of radio play and live success, experiencing problems with their record company and issues surrounding record distribution.

Reformations: 2005, 2011–2012, 2022–2023
In 2005, Brother Cane reunited for two concerts. One of the shows was released as a two-disc set with previously unreleased backstage, offstage, concert footage (a 40-minute show as the opening act for Van Halen in Fresno from '95) and interview content. Brother Cane again reunited for a brief tour in 2012.

In March 2022, Brother Cane announced they would reunite for live shows later in the year. Johnson is rejoined by original bass guitarist Glenn Maxey, along with Buck Johnson (Aerosmith, Hollywood Vampires) on keyboards, and drummer Jarred Pope from Johnson's solo band. The first show was at the Northern Lights Theater in Milwaukee, Wisconsin on April 22. Further shows in Birmingham, Alabama and Nashville, Tennessee are also planned, with the live set to feature songs from the band's first album, including songs never played live before, plus hits from the later albums. 

A full Brother Cane tour is planned for 2023, to coincide with the 30th anniversary of the release of the Brother Cane album. Johnson stated: "I’m just over the moon about this. Brother Cane fans are some of the most passionate that I've encountered in all of my travels. I'm certainly proud of all these songs, and the guys and I are looking forward to bringing them to the people once again."

Other projects
Brother Cane frontman Damon Johnson has been involved in numerous projects since the initial demise of the band, including Red Halo, Slave to the System (a band that also features long-time Queensrÿche drummer Scott Rockenfield), and Whiskey Falls. Johnson was touring guitarist for Alice Cooper from 2004 to 2011, at which time he departed Cooper's band to join Thin Lizzy. He has remained with the band since then, and also co-founded Thin Lizzy spin-off band Black Star Riders, with whom he recorded three albums. Johnson also performs with Lynyrd Skynyrd, standing in for Gary Rossington, who is recovering from heart surgery.

Glick worked with Johnson in Slave to the System, before joining Jesse James Dupree and Jackyl. Guitarist David Anderson now plays with ARS (Atlanta Rhythm Section) when they tour.

After his departure from Brother Cane, Glenn Maxey moved away from music and worked in industrial electronics for 28 years, before returning to music in 2021 with Bishop Gunn frontman Travis McCready's solo band.

Band members
1990–1998
Damon Johnson – lead vocals, guitar
David Anderson – guitar (Seeds, Wishpool)
Roman Glick – guitar (Brother Cane), bass guitar (Seeds, Wishpool)
Glenn Maxey – bass guitar (Brother Cane'')
Scott Collier – drums

2011
Damon Johnson – lead vocals, guitar
Zach Myers (Shinedown) – guitar
Chuck Garric (Alice Cooper) – bass guitar
Scott Collier – drums

2012
Damon Johnson – lead vocals, guitar
David Anderson – guitar
Chuck Garric – bass guitar
Scott Collier – drums

2022–
Damon Johnson – lead vocals, guitar
Glenn Maxey – bass guitar
Buck Johnson – keyboards, backing vocals
Jarred Pope – drums

Discography

Studio albums

Compilations

Singles

Music videos

References

External links
 

Alternative rock groups from Alabama
American hard rock musical groups
American southern rock musical groups
Musical groups established in 1990
Musical groups disestablished in 1998
Musical groups from Birmingham, Alabama